Guttation is the exudation of drops of xylem sap on the tips or edges of leaves of some vascular plants, such as grasses, and a number of fungi, which are not plants but were previously categorized as such and studied as part of botany. Guttation (from Latin gutta drop) is not to be confused with dew, which condenses from the atmosphere onto the plant or fungus surface and does not originate from within them. Guttation generally happens at night.

Process 

At night, transpiration usually does not occur, because most plants have their stomata closed. When there is a high soil moisture level, water will enter plant roots, because the water potential of the roots is lower than in the soil solution. The water will accumulate in the plant, creating a slight root pressure. The root pressure forces some water to exude through special leaf tip or edge structures, hydathodes or water glands, forming drops. Root pressure provides the impetus for this flow, rather than transpirational pull. Guttation is most noticeable when transpiration is suppressed and the relative humidity is high, such as during the night. 

Guttation formation in fungi is important for visual identification, but the process causing it is unknown. However, due to its association with stages of rapid growth in the life cycle of fungi, it has been hypothesised that during rapid metabolism excess water produced by respiration is exuded.

Chemical content 
Guttation fluid may contain a variety of organic and inorganic compounds, mainly sugars, and potassium. On drying, a white crust remains on the leaf surface.

Girolami et al. (2005) found that guttation drops from corn plants germinated from neonicotinoid-coated seeds could contain amounts of insecticide consistently higher than 10 mg/L, and up to 200 mg/L for the neonicotinoid imidacloprid. Concentrations this high are near those of active ingredients applied in field sprays for pest control and sometimes even higher. It was found that when bees consume guttation drops collected from plants grown from neonicotinoid-coated seeds, they die within a few minutes. This phenomenon may be a factor in bee deaths and, consequently, colony collapse disorder.

Nitrogen levels 
If high levels of nitrogen appear in the fluid, it is a sign of fertilizer burn.

See also 
 Homeostasis
 Osmosis
 Soil plant atmosphere continuum

References 

Plant physiology